Nenad Kutlačić (Cyrillic: Ненад Кутлачић; born 4 March 1981) is a Bosnian former professional footballer who played as a defender.

Club career
After starting out with his hometown club Radnik Bijeljina, Kutlačić moved abroad to FR Yugoslavia champions Partizan in the summer of 2002. He never made an official debut for the team, but instead played on loan at Bosnian side Rudar Ugljevik (2002–2004), as well as two Serbian clubs, Spartak Subotica (2004–05) and Budućnost Banatski Dvor (2005–06).

In early 2007, Kutlačić was transferred to Romanian club Pandurii Târgu Jiu. He made three appearances in the second half of the 2006–07 Liga I season. Over the next two years, Kutlačić played on loan at Minerul Motru (Liga III, 2007–08) and Râmnicu Vâlcea (Liga II, 2008–09). He then returned to Pandurii and played for their reserve team, before being released by the club in late 2009.

After a brief spell in Sweden, Kutlačić returned to his parent club Radnik Bijeljina. He later played for Jedinstvo Brodac in the Second League of the Republika Srpska, making 20 appearances in the 2014–15 season.

International career
Kutlačić was capped two times for the Bosnia and Herzegovina national under-21 football team during the 2004 UEFA European Under-21 Championship qualification.

References

External links
 
 
 

1981 births
Living people
People from Bijeljina
Serbs of Bosnia and Herzegovina
Association football defenders
Bosnia and Herzegovina footballers
Bosnia and Herzegovina under-21 international footballers
FK Radnik Bijeljina players
FK Partizan players
FK Rudar Ugljevik players
FK Spartak Subotica players
FK Budućnost Banatski Dvor players
FK Banat Zrenjanin players
CS Pandurii Târgu Jiu players
CS Minerul Motru players
SCM Râmnicu Vâlcea players
FK Modriča players
FK Drina Zvornik players
IF Limhamn Bunkeflo (men) players
Premier League of Bosnia and Herzegovina players
First League of Serbia and Montenegro players
Liga I players
Liga II players
Liga III players
Serbian SuperLiga players
Ettan Fotboll players
Bosnia and Herzegovina expatriate footballers
Expatriate footballers in Serbia and Montenegro
Bosnia and Herzegovina expatriate sportspeople in Serbia and Montenegro
Expatriate footballers in Romania
Bosnia and Herzegovina expatriate sportspeople in Romania
Expatriate footballers in Serbia
Bosnia and Herzegovina expatriate sportspeople in Serbia
Expatriate footballers in Sweden
Bosnia and Herzegovina expatriate sportspeople in Sweden